Canadian Youth for Choice (CYC) is a pro-choice youth advocacy group based in Ottawa, Ontario. The group, which is the first of its kind in Canada, advocates for the sexual and reproductive rights of people between the ages of 13 and 30.

CYC work with the goal of increasing access to information and services relating to reproductive health for all Canadian youth. They have written a "Canadian Charter of Sexual and Reproductive Rights of Youth" and have collected at least 500 signatures asking the House of Commons of Canada to pass it into law.

Four members of Canadian Youth for Choice participated in a cross-country tour designed to provide sex education in the summer of 2007.

Mission statement
CYC envision a Canada where sexual and reproductive rights, along with non-biased and comprehensive sexual and reproductive health information and services are available freely and equally to all youth regardless of their gender, location, religion, ethnicity, mental or physical ability, sexual orientation and or socio-economic status.

We work towards:
 One Improving the limited access to sexual and reproductive health rights and services in Canada
 Two Creating a more consistent and comprehensive sexual health education curriculum
 Three Advocating for sexual and reproductive rights

CYC is the first organized pro-choice youth network in Canada, and is committed to continuing its growth across the country, while raising awareness about sexual and reproductive health and rights.

CYC is supported by the Canadian Federation for Sexual Health's commitment to human rights, which includes healthy sexuality, its diversity of expression, and reproductive choice. CYC is the first organized pro-choice youth network in Canada, and is committed to continuing its growth across the country, while raising awareness about sexual and reproductive health and rights.

Organizational structure
Canadian Youth for Choice (CYC) is supported by the Canadian Federation for Sexual Health (formerly known as the Planned Parenthood Federation of Canada). Canadian Federation for Sexual Health (CFSH) oversees all CYC activities, with CYC's steering committee and general members working in close coordination with CFSH through the CYC coordinator.

CYC accepts applications for membership on an ongoing basis, and strives to support a diverse membership, while encouraging everyone to share his or her talents and skills to better the organization. All members must support the mission and mandate of both CYC and CFSH.

Canadian Federation for Sexual Health
The role of the Canadian Federation for Sexual Health is to support Canadian Youth for Choice; their support comes in many forms including mentoring and providing guidance. CFSH oversees all activities of CYC and maintains the right to make final decisions on all issues. CYC receives all funding through CFSH.

Canadian Youth for Choice Project Coordinator
The CYC coordinator acts as a liaison between Canadian Youth for Choice and Canadian Federation for Sexual Health, to coordinate, monitor and provide support to CYC and its activities and members. The current project coordinator is Lisa Middleton of Ottawa.

Canadian Youth for Choice Steering Committee
The CYC Steering Committee is the decision-making body of the CYC. The Steering Committee is responsible for making decisions regarding all activities within the group (including membership) and to provide leadership and guidance for members.

Canadian Youth for Choice General Members
The general members of CYC play an active role in the organization. General members participate in advocacy activities, support the steering committee in making decisions, provide feedback to steering committee members, and commit to the principles and values of the organization

References

External links
 Canadian Youth for Choice web site
 Canadian Federation for Sexual Health web site

Abortion-rights organizations in Canada
Youth-led organizations